The Canadian Guide to Uniform Legal Citation (McGill Guide or Red Book) is a legal citation guide in Canada. It is published by the McGill Law Journal of the McGill University Faculty of Law and is used by law students, scholars, and lawyers throughout Canada. The book is bilingual, one half being in English and the other in French (Manuel canadien de la référence juridique).

Overview 
The first edition of the McGill Guide was published in 1986. A new edition of the book is released once every four years. While the McGill Guide is the standard citation guide taught at law schools throughout Canada, many jurisdictions have their own unique citation styles. 

In contrast to other guides (such as the Bluebook) that are created and published jointly by multiple law reviews, the McGill Guide is primarily written by full-time students on the McGill Law Journal and is published by a separate corporation. The McGill Guide is compiled by the citations editor of the McGill Law Journal and is published by Thomson Reuters (previously Carswell). An online subscription version of the McGill Guide was made available on Westlaw Canada in 2014.

Elements 
The 9th edition of the McGill Guide provides guidance on the style and formatting of the following elements of legal publications:

 Legislation
 Jurisprudence
 Government Documents
 International Materials
 Secondary Sources and Other Materials
 Foreign Sources

Reception 
Similar to other uniform legal citation guides (such as the Bluebook), the McGill Guide has been subject to scrutiny by the legal community. One of the most common criticisms is a lack of access to the book due to the price ($79.00 CAD), which is sold by the Thomson Reuters, rather than directly by the McGill Law Journal. The McGill Law Journal has committed to open access for its journal, but has yet to do so for its cite guide.

See also

 
 Citation of Canadian legislation

References

External links
 
 Publisher, Carswell
 "McGill Citation Style" - Ontario Tech University

Legal citation guides
Canadian non-fiction books